Voove may refer to:
 Bubi people, also called Voove, an ethnic group inhabiting Bioko Island in Equatorial Guinea
 Bube language, the language of the Bubi people, one dialect of which is called eVoové

Disambiguation pages